is a railway station straddling the boundary between the cities of Inazawa and Ichinomiya, Aichi Prefecture, Japan, operated by Meitetsu.

Lines
Shima-Ujinaga Station is served by the Meitetsu Nagoya Main Line and is 82.9 kilometers from the terminus of the line at Toyohashi Station.

Station layout
The station has two opposed unnumbered side platforms connected by a level crossing. The platforms are offset, with one platform in the city of Inazawa and the other in the city of Ichinomiya.  The station has automated ticket machines, Manaca automated turnstiles and is unattended.

Platforms

Adjacent stations

Station history
Shima-Ujinaga Station was opened on February 15, 1924 as two separate stations. The station assumed its present name on September 1, 1930.

Passenger statistics
In fiscal 2017, the station was used by an average of 1,998 passengers daily (boarding passengers only).

Surrounding area
 Ichinomiya Kodo High School
 Ichinomiya Yamato Junior High School
 Ichinomiya Yamato Elementary School

See also
 List of Railway Stations in Japan

References

External links

 Official web page 

Railway stations in Japan opened in 1924
Railway stations in Aichi Prefecture
Stations of Nagoya Railroad
Inazawa
Ichinomiya, Aichi